In cartography and geology, a topological map is a type of diagram that has been simplified so that only vital information remains and unnecessary detail has been removed. These maps lack scale, also distance and direction are subject to change and/or variation, but the topological relationship between points is maintained.  A good example are the tube maps for the London Underground and the New York City Subway.

See also

Outline of cartography

References

Map types